Peptide methionine sulfoxide reductase may refer to:

 Protein-methionine-S-oxide reductase
 Peptide-methionine (S)-S-oxide reductase